The X Bolivarian Games (Spanish: Juegos Bolivarianos) were a multi-sport event held between November 9–18, 1985, in Cuenca, Ambato,  and Portoviejo, Ecuador. The Games were organized by the Bolivarian Sports Organization (ODEBO).

The opening ceremony took place on November 9, 1985, at the Estadio Alejandro Serrano Aguilar in Cuenca.  The Games were officially opened by Ecuadorean president León Febres Cordero.  Torch lighter were cyclist Jhon Jarrín and football player Arturo Cárdenas, gold medalist at the 1965 Bolivarian Games.

A detailed history of the early editions of the Bolivarian Games between 1938 and 1989 was published in a book written (in Spanish) by José Gamarra Zorrilla, former president of the Bolivian Olympic Committee, and first president (1976-1982) of ODESUR.  Gold medal winners from Ecuador were published by the Comité Olímpico Ecuatoriano.

Participation 
Athletes from 6 countries were reported to participate:

Sports 
The following 20 sports were explicitly mentioned:

Aquatic sports 
 Diving
 Swimming
 Athletics
 Baseball
 Basketball
 Bowling
 Boxing
 Chess
Cycling 
 Road cycling
 Track cycling
 Equestrian
 Football
 Gymnastics (artistic)
 Judo
 Sailing
 Shooting
 Table tennis
 Taekwondo
 Tennis
 Volleyball
 Weightlifting
 Wrestling

Medal count
The medal count for these Games is tabulated below. This table is sorted by the number of gold medals earned by each country.  The number of silver medals is taken into consideration next, and then the number of bronze medals.

References 

 

Bolivarian Games
S
Bolivarian Games
Bolivarian Games
B
Multi-sport events in Ecuador
Cuenca, Ecuador
Ambato, Ecuador
November 1985 sports events in South America